This is a list of State Highways in Himachal Pradesh, India.

Introduction

Himachal Pradesh state has a good road network. There are 9 national highways with total length of 1,250 km, 20 state highways with total length of 1,625 km and 45 major district roads  with total length of 1753.05 km. No road in Himachal is a state highway after the government issued a notification denotifying all sixteen state highways in 2017.

List of state highways in Himachal Pradesh

References
Himachal Pradesh NIC Site
Himachal Denotifies State Highways
List of State Highways in Himachal Pradesh

Roads in Himachal Pradesh
 
Himachal Pradesh State Highways
Himachal Pradesh-related lists